Kataržina Sosna (born 30 November 1990) is a Lithuanian racing cyclist. She competed in the 2012 UCI Road World Championships in Valkenburg aan de Geul and in the 2013 UCI women's time trial in Florence.

Major results

Road

2008 
1st Overall Omloop van Borsele Juniors
1st Stage 4

2010 
1st  Time Trial, National Road Championships
1st GP Vallaton
1st Cham-Hagendorn
3rd Time Trial, UEC U23 European Road Championship
7th Sparkassen Giro

2011 
2nd Time Trial, National Road Championships
3rd Time Trial, UEC U23 European Road Championship

2012 
National Road Championships
2nd Time Trial
3rd Road Race
9th Time Trial, UEC U23 European Road Championship
10th Heydar Aliyev Anniversary Time Trial

2013 
2nd Time Trial, National Road Championships

2014 
3rd Time Trial, National Road Championships

2019 
National Road Championships
1st  Time Trial
2nd Road Race

2020 
National Road Championships
1st  Time Trial
2nd Road Race

Mountainbike
2015 
2nd Iseo Mountainbike 

2016 
1st Iseo Mountainbike 
1st Calonge Marathon
3rd Marathon, UEC U23 European Mountainbike Championship

2017 
1st  Marathon, National Mountainbike Championships

References

External links
 

1990 births
Living people
Lithuanian female cyclists
Sportspeople from Vilnius